Daniel Daney (born 11 December 1905, date of death unknown) was a French boxer who competed in the 1924 Summer Olympics. In 1924 he was eliminated in the quarterfinals of the middleweight class after losing to the upcoming bronze medalist Joseph Beecken.

References

External links
 
 Daniel Daney's profile at Sport Reference.com

Middleweight boxers
Olympic boxers of France
Boxers at the 1924 Summer Olympics
1905 births
Year of death missing
French male boxers